Abante Vizcaya is a Nueva Vizcaya regional political party in the Philippines, which was formerly affiliated with the Laban ng Demokratikong Pilipino (Agapito Aquino Faction), now closely affiliated with the Nacionalista Party and the Genuine Opposition. It was the former party of incumbent Nueva Vizcaya Congresswoman Luisa Lloren Cuaresma.

References

Local political parties in the Philippines
Politics of Nueva Vizcaya
Regionalist parties